Tata Capital Limited is a financial and investment service provider in India. The company is based in Mumbai and has more than 100 branches across the country. The firm offers consumer loans, wealth management, commercial finance, and infrastructure finance, among others.

Overview
Tata Capital, a subsidiary of Tata Sons Limited, was established in the year 2007.  It is the financial services arm of the USD 108 billion Tata Group. It is a holding company of Tata Capital Financial Services Limited (TCFSL), Tata Securities Limited, and Tata Capital Housing Finance Limited.

The company is registered with the Reserve Bank of India (RBI) as a Systematically Important Deposit Accepting Non-Banking Financial Company. Tata Capital offers services like commercial finance, investment banking, consumer loans, private equity, treasury advisory, and credit cards. It serves corporate, retail, and institutional customers through its wholly owned subsidiary, TCFSL.

Business developments and initiatives

Acquisition by Thomas Cook
In October 2017, Thomas Cook India Group acquired the forex and travel units of Tata Capital. These were its wholly owned subsidiaries, Tata Capital Travel and Services Limited and Tata Capital Forex Limited.

Agreement with Capital Float
In October 2017, Tata Capital entered into an agreement with Capital Float to offer Working Capital Loans to small and medium-sized enterprises (SMEs) in the country through co-lending on the latter’s digital lending platform. Their “Pay Later” product enables borrowers to enjoy a credit limit of up to INR 50 lakh for one year.

Salaam Loans
Under its brand initiative, Do Right, Tata Capital launched Salaam Loans in May 2017. The initiative is aimed at lending to individuals who do not have access to organized credit. Under Salaam Loans, the company eliminated the requirement of filling numerous forms and checking applicant's CIBIL score for small tickets loans. It enables individuals to showcase stories on digital and social media. The stories with maximum ‘salaams’ or likes are entitled to secure a loan from Tata Capital.  The company then offers personal loans up to INR one lakh at discounted rates to deserving individuals.

Partnership with Biz2Credit
In April 2016, Tata Capital joined hands with Biz2credit to facilitate finance to small and medium enterprises (SMEs). Biz2Credit is an online credit resource offering finance to small businesses.

Do Right
Launched in 2013, the Do Right initiative aims to spread the spirit of 'doing right'. The company leads a number of other initiatives under the Do Right campaign.

Awards and recognitions
 In 2017, the Salaam Loan initiative won Gold in the category of ‘Digital – Social Purpose’ and Bronze in the category of ‘Public Relations – Financial Services’ at the Spikes Asia Awards
 In 2016, Tata Capital became the first Indian company to receive the Global EthicMark Award for Best Advertising Campaign in the ‘For Profit’ category for its Do Right initiative
 In 2015, the company won Gallup Great Workplace Award
 In 2014, Tata Capital’s online campaign, ‘Half Stories—The Journey of Doing Right’ received the Award of Excellence (Gold) in the category of Integrated Campaign – Social Responsibility at the 20th Annual Communicator Awards and ‘Grand Prix’ at the ABBY Awards
 In 2013, Tata Capital was credited for its Human Resource (HR) Excellence at the CII National HR Excellence Award Confluence

References

External links
 Official Website

Tata Group
Tata Group subsidiaries
Financial services companies based in Mumbai
Indian companies established in 2007
2007 establishments in Maharashtra
Financial services companies established in 2007